A rural municipality (RM) is a type of incorporated municipality in the Canadian province of Saskatchewan. A rural municipality is created by the Minister of Municipal Relations by ministerial order via section 49 of The Municipalities Act.

Saskatchewan has 296 rural municipalities, which are located in the central and southern portions of the province. Saskatchewan's largest and smallest rural municipalities are the RM of Corman Park No. 344 and the RM of Glen McPherson No. 46 with populations of 8,568 and 72 respectively.

The northern half of the province does not lie within any rural municipality, but is rather administered by the provincial government through the Northern Saskatchewan Administration District.

List

Former rural municipalities

See also
List of communities in Saskatchewan
List of municipal districts in Alberta
List of municipalities in Saskatchewan
List of rural municipalities in Manitoba

References

Rural municipalities